Rizoupoli is a neighborhood of Nea Filadelfeia-Chalkidona, Greece. It is the northernmost neighborhood of  municipality along with the small district Probonas. The district is located between Patissia and Nea Philadelphia and is home to the Georgios Kamaras Stadium.

History
Rizoupoli is named after Ioannis Rizopoulos, a businessman and land developer of the early 20th century. Rizopoulos's historic mansion stood in the area until 2002, when the Greek government agreed for its demolition. After the Asia Minor Catastrophe many refugees from Ionia and other places of Asia Minor settled in Rizoupoli. In 1948, the football stadium of Rizoupoli was built and became the home stadium of Apollon Smyrni, a historic club founded in Smyrni in 1891.

Places of interest

A big cave with an area of 2,500 m2 is located in Rizoupoli. It is called Profitis Ilias. In the interior the cave, remains dating from the stone age (5.000 B.C.) have been found.

References

Neighbourhoods in Athens